The 1954 United States Senate election in South Dakota took place on November 2, 1954. Incumbent Republican Senator Karl E. Mundt ran for re-election to his second term. He was opposed by former State Representative Kenneth Holum, the Democratic nominee. Mundt defeated Holum in a landslide to win re-election.

Primary elections
Both Mundt and Holum won their primaries without opposition. Mundt announced that he would seek a second term on December 31, 1953, amid speculation that Governor Sigurd Anderson would challenge him in the Republican primary. However, on February 9, 1954, Anderson announced that he wouldn't challenge Mundt, and would instead retire rather than seek re-election. No candidates emerged against Mundt until Kenneth Holum, a former State Representative from Groton, announced his campaign on April 5, 1954. Former State Senator David L. Wickens announced that he would challenge Mundt in the Republican primary, but was unable to gather a sufficient number of petitions and dropped out of the race. With Wickens out of the race, no other candidates emerged, and Mundt and Holum faced no opposition for their parties' nominations. Accordingly, both races were removed from the primary election ballot.

General election

Results

References

South Dakota
1954
1954 South Dakota elections